, also known as Pastoral Hide and Seek, is a 1974 Japanese drama film directed by Shūji Terayama. It was entered into the 1975 Cannes Film Festival.

Cast
 Kantaro Suga - Me
 Hiroyuki Takano - Me, as a boy
 Yoshio Harada - Arashi
 Izumi Hara - Phantom of old woman
 Masumi Harukawa
 Isao Kimura - Film Critic
 Kan Mikami
 Keiko Niitaka
 Yoko Ran
 J.A. Seazer - Tengu Kurama
 Kaoru Yachigusa

Reception
In a 2011 case for the film's release into The Criterion Collection, Robert Nishimura lauded Pastoral: To Die in the Country as "an important film by an important filmmaker". He cited its "effortless phantasmagorical freedom" and referred to the work as "so unique and spellbinding that it transcends all classification."

References

External links

1974 drama films
1974 films
Films directed by Shūji Terayama
1970s Japanese-language films
1970s Japanese films